Jamie Browne (born 3 July 1989) is a US Virgin Islands soccer player who currently plays as a midfielder for Dallas City FC.

Browne made his first appearance on the senior national team on September 27, 2006 at the young age of 17. Browne scored his first international professional goal against Antigua and Barbuda in an 8-1 defeat on September 6, 2011 in 2014 World Cup qualification group stage. Browne scored against Barbados during qualification for the 2018 FIFA world cup in Russia.

International goals
Scores and results list United States Virgin Islands' goal tally first.

See also 
 List of top international men's football goalscorers by country

References

External links
National Football Teams profile

1989 births
Living people
Association football midfielders
United States Virgin Islands soccer players
United States Virgin Islands international soccer players